Pepene Eketone (ca. 1856 – 9 November 1933) was a New Zealand  interpreter, native agent, assessor and politician. Of Māori descent, he identified with the Ngāti Maniapoto iwi. He was born in Taranaki, New Zealand in circa 1856.

He sometimes used an English name, which was based on missionaries, and was thus known as Fairburn Eggleston or Fairburn Eccleston. The official return for the  lists him as Pepene Tango Eketone; the middle name is not mentioned in his Dictionary of New Zealand Biography.

He had one last (unsuccessful) attempt of getting elected in the Western Maori electorate in the  general election; of the six candidates, he came fourth.

References

1856 births
1933 deaths
Interpreters
People from Taranaki
Ngāti Maniapoto people
New Zealand Māori public servants
Unsuccessful candidates in the 1887 New Zealand general election
Unsuccessful candidates in the 1890 New Zealand general election
Unsuccessful candidates in the 1893 New Zealand general election
Unsuccessful candidates in the 1896 New Zealand general election
Unsuccessful candidates in the 1908 New Zealand general election
Unsuccessful candidates in the 1931 New Zealand general election
19th-century New Zealand politicians